William Keith Burge (known as Keith Burge and born 10 August 1950) is a Welsh former football referee. He officiated in the English Football League and Premier League, and for FIFA. He hails from Tonypandy in the county borough of Rhondda Cynon Taff, Glamorgan. His other occupation is as a civil servant.

Career
He was appointed as a referee to the Football League in 1986, at the age of thirty-five - the last Welsh referee to join the English list, as this option was withdrawn by UEFA in 1997.

He was on the first list of referees to officiate in the new Premier League for the 1992-93 season, and made his debut there on 5 September 1992, taking charge of the 3-2 win by Wimbledon over Arsenal at Plough Lane.

He was a FIFA official until 1995, when he reached the international retirement age of forty-five. One of his last appointments was in the Euro '96 qualifying tournament, when Lithuania drew 0-0 at home to Croatia on 29 March 1995.

Domestically, he retained his place on the Premier League list for six seasons, until he retired from refereeing completely after his final match in the Premier League, a 2-1 win by Manchester United over Aston Villa at Old Trafford on 1 May 1999.

References

External links
Keith Burge Referee Statistics at soccerbase.com (incomplete)

1950 births
Welsh football referees
Premier League referees
People from Tonypandy
Sportspeople from Rhondda Cynon Taf
Living people